In baseball statistics, plate appearances per strikeout (PA/SO) represents a ratio of the number of times a batter strikes out to their plate appearance. 

This statistic allows a defensive team to examine the opposing team's lineup for hitters who are more prone to strikeout. Such players, when batting, are typically more aggressive than the average hitter. This knowledge permits the pitcher to approach the batter with more pitching options, often throwing more balls out of the strike zone in the hope that the batter will swing and miss.
 
The number of this statistic can be calculated by dividing a player's total number of plate appearances by their total number of strikeouts. For example, Reggie Jackson collected 2,597 strikeouts and 11,418 plate appearances in his 21-year baseball career, recording a 4.39 PA/SO, which suggests that for every 4.39 plate appearance Jackson had one strikeout.

Sources
MLB.com – Baseball basics abbreviations
FanGraphs Sabermetrics Library

External links
Baseball Almanac – All-time career leaders in Major League strikeouts 
The all-time leaders in plate appearances per strikeout – Article by Joe Pawlikowski

Baseball statistics
Batting (baseball)
Baseball terminology